Omicron Virginis (ο Vir, ο Virginis) is a star in the zodiac constellation of Virgo. It is visible to the naked eye with an apparent visual magnitude of +4.12. Based upon parallax measurements, it is about 163 light years from the Sun.

ο Virginis is a G-type giant star with a stellar classification of G8 IIIa CN-1Ba1CH1. This indicates that it is a Barium star. Typically Barium stars are close binaries with a white dwarf companion, but no companion has been detected for ο Virginis. It has been suggested that an excess SiIV emission flux is due to an unseen white dwarf companion.

ο Virginis is a giant star around ten times larger than the Sun. Although it is slightly cooler, it is radiating about 60-132 times the luminosity of the Sun. It is over twice as massive as the Sun and is around a billion years old.  A simplified statistical analysis suggests that ο Virginis is likely to be a red giant branch star fusing hydrogen in a shell around an inert helium core, but there is about a 22% chance that it is a horizontal branch star fusing helium in its core.

References

G-type giants
Barium stars
Virginis, Omicron
Virgo (constellation)
BD+09 2583
Virginis, 009
3703
104979
058948
4608